The Winnower was a publishing platform and journal that offered traditional scholarly publishing tools (Digital Object Identifiers (DOIs), permanent archival, Altmetrics, PDF creation, etc.) to enable rigorous scholastic discussion of topics across all areas of intellectual inquiry, whether in the sciences, humanities, public policy, or otherwise.  Between 2014 and 2016, The Winnower published and archived the following:

 Student Essays
 Conference Proceedings
 Peer Reviews
 Theses
 Grants
 Book Reviews
 Journal Clubs
 How-to's
 Lab notes
 Scholarly reddit AMAs
 Foldscope Images
 Blog posts
 Original research
 Open Letters.

History 
The Winnower was founded by Dr. Joshua Nicholson. It went live on May 27, 2014, with a primary focus of publishing scientific research, but expanded its scope to include a diverse set of topics spanning the humanities, social sciences, science policy, and professional commentaries, to name just a few.  As of April 2016 it had over 1,000 publications from 4,500+ authors around the world.

In November 2016, it was announced that the publishing platform Authorea had bought The Winnower. New submissions were then stopped, with the site directing authors to Authorea. The site has been largely inactive but archived since 2016. Authorea was in turn purchased by one of the 'big 5' academic publishers, Wiley, in 2018.

Post-publication Peer Review 
The Winnower offered post-publication peer review. After submission, the paper was immediately made visible online, and was open for public, non-anonymous reviews by registered members of The Winnower community. Articles could be revised indefinitely until the author chose to "freeze" a final version and purchase a digital object identifier.

See also 
 Authorea
 Scholarly peer review
 F1000Research
 Journal club
 Conference Proceedings

References 

Publications established in 2014
Academic journal online publishing platforms